Oliver's Universe is a 2022 coming-of-age film directed by  which stars Rubén Fulgencio as the title character alongside Salva Reina, María León and Pedro Casablanc. It adapts the novel El universo de Óliver by Miguel Ángel González Carrasco.

Plot 
Set in 1985, with the backdrop of the approach of Comet Halley to Earth, the plot tracks the mishaps of Óliver, an overly imaginative tween, who, having just moved together with his parents to the home of crazed grandfather Gabriel near Algeciras, seeks the latter's help in order to cope with his problems.

Cast

Production 
An adaptation of the novel El universo de Óliver by Miguel Ángel González, the screenplay was penned by Miguel Ángel González, Alexis Morante and Raúl Santos. The film was produced by Pecado Films (José Alba) and La Claqueta PC (Olmo Figueredo González-Quevedo) alongside Sinehan Capital AIE. It was shot in Campo de Gibraltar in 2021.

Bunbury performed a theme for the film: "Esperando una señal", produced by Rafa Sardina and otherwise also featuring Mike Garson (piano), Carmine Rojas (bass), Rafael Padilla (percussionist), Victor Indrizzo (drums) and Gabi Martínez (guitar).

Release 
The film was pre-screened on 7 May 2022 at the Algeciras' Teatro Municipal Florida. Distributed by Filmax, the film had a wide release in Spanish theatres on 13 May 2022.

Reception 
Sergio F. Pinilla of Cinemanía rated the film with 4 out of 5 stars assessing that it blends the fantasy imagery of films from the 1980s with the family portrait of a society and era, bringing in a universe in "which children and adults, gitanos and payos, the unfortunate and the fortunate, live side by side and collide".

Pablo Vázquez of Fotogramas rated the film 3 out of 5 stars, considering that it allows a committed cast to shine while the overall product perhaps languishes compared to other works, highlighting "a gigantic Casablanc and a no less brilliant Reina" and the subplot pertaining the girl respectively as the best and worst things about the film.

Accolades 

|-
| rowspan = "10" align = "center" | 2023 || rowspan = "9" | 2nd Carmen Awards || Best Director || Alexis Morante ||  || rowspan = "9" | 
|-
| Best Actor || Salva Reina || 
|-
| Best Adapted Screenplay || Alexis Morante, Raúl Santos, Miguel Ángel González || 
|-
| Best Supporting Actress || María León || 
|-
| Best Supporting Actor || Pedro Casablanc || 
|-
| Best New Actor || Lorca Gutiérrez Prada || 
|-
| Best Costume Design || Lourdes Fuentes || 
|-
| Best Sound || Diana Sagrista, Vicente Villaescusa || 
|-
| Best Special Effects || Juan Ventura, Amparo Martínez || 
|-
| 31st Actors and Actresses Union Awards || Best Film Actor in a Secondary Role || Pedro Casablanc ||  || 
|}

See also 
 List of Spanish films of 2022

References

External links 
 Oliver's Universe at ICAA's Catálogo de Cinespañol

Films set in 1985
Films shot in the province of Cádiz
Films set in Andalusia
2020s coming-of-age films
Spanish coming-of-age films
American coming-of-age films
Spanish drama films
American drama films
Romanian drama films
Films based on Spanish novels
Spanish fantasy films
2020s Spanish-language films
2020s Spanish films
2020s American films
La Claqueta PC films
Pecado Films films